Archery was contested at the 2017 Summer Universiade from August 20 to 24 at the National Taiwan Sport University Stadium in Taoyuan, Taiwan.

Participant nations
237 archers from 39 nations participated at the 2017 Summer Universiade.

Medal summary

Medal table

Recurve

Compound

References

External links
2017 Summer Universiade – Archery
Result book – Archery

 
Universiade
2017 Summer Universiade events
Archery at the Summer Universiade